This is a list of countries by annualized interest rate set by the central bank for charging commercial, depository banks for loans to meet temporary shortages of funds.

List

References

Central bank interest rates
Central bank